"Bears Discover Fire" is a science fiction short story by American science fiction author Terry Bisson. It concerns aging and evolution in the US South, the dream of wilderness, and community. The premise is that bears have discovered fire, and are having campfires on highway medians.

It was originally published in Isaac Asimov’s Science Fiction Magazine in August 1990.

Reception
"Bears Discover Fire" won the Hugo Award for Best Short Story and the Nebula Award for Best Short Story. It was the inspiration for Michael Bishop's 2005 story "Bears Discover Smut".

In popular culture

"Bears Discover Fire" has been adapted into a Columbia University MFA thesis film directed by Ben Leonberg and produced by Scott Riehs.

Awards
 1991 Hugo Award for Best Short Story
 1990 Nebula Award for Best Short Story
 1991 Asimov's Reader's Award
 1991 The Theodore Sturgeon Memorial Award
 1991 Locus Award
 1991 SF Chronicle Award

References

External links
Full text at Lightspeed Magazine
 
 Movie short: http://www.bearsdiscoverfire.com/

1990 short stories
Short stories by Terry Bisson
Hugo Award for Best Short Story winning works
Works originally published in Asimov's Science Fiction
Nebula Award for Best Short Story-winning works
Theodore Sturgeon Award-winning works